Kevin Burrows (born 25 November 1964 from Ipswich, Suffolk) is a former English professional darts player, who played in the Professional Darts Corporation events.

Career
From Ipswich, Suffolk, Burrows first was brought in to make up the numbers in the inaugural 1994 WDC World Darts Championship, and lost both his group matches to Peter Evison and Jerry Umberger, without winning a set. In the following 3 years, he qualified for the 1994 and 1995 World Matchplay, but lost in the first round on both occasions.

World Championship performances results

PDC
 1994: Last 24 Group (lost to Peter Evison 0–3) and (lost to Jerry Umberger 2–3) (sets)

References

External links

1964 births
Living people
English darts players
Professional Darts Corporation early era players
British Darts Organisation players
Sportspeople from Ipswich